Adile Sultan ("justice, fairness"; 10 February 1887 – 6 December 1973) was an Ottoman princess, the daughter of Şehzade Mehmed Selaheddin, son of Sultan Murad V. Her mother was Tevhide Zatıgül Hanım.

Early life
Adile Sultan was born on 10 February 1887 in the Çırağan Palace. Her father was Şehzade Mehmed Selaheddin, son of Murad V and Reftarıdil Kadın. Her mother was Tevhide Zatıgül Hanım, daughter of Ibrahim Bey and Hanım. She had two older full sisters, Celile Sultan and Rukiye Sultan, a younger full brother, Şehzade Mehmed, stillborn, and a younger full sister, Emine Atiye Sultan. She spent her early years in confinement in the Çırağan Palace, which at the time served as a prison for Murad V, deposed in 1876 by his half-brother Abdülhamid II, and his entire family. The confinement ended with Murad V's death in 1904.

Marriages
Her first husband was Faik Bey. They married on 15 May 1910 in the Göztepe Palace. They didn't have children. They divorced in 1913. Her second husband was Moralizade Selaheddin Ali Bey. He was the son of Moralizade Mehmed Ali Bey and Zehra Aliye Hanım. They married on 3 April 1914 in the Göztepe Palace. The two together had one daughter, Nilüfer Hanımsultan, born on 4 January 1916. She was widowed at his death in December 1918.

Philanthropy
In about 1911 the Kadıköy (Osmanlı) Fukaraperver Cemiyeti Hanımlar Şubesi was established under the patronage of Adile Sultan. It provided food, medicines and clothes to orphans, widows and old and disabled women. It also provided clothing for the children of two schools and gave a breakfast consisting of a bowl of soup and a slice of bread to more than a hundred persons every day. She was also the patron of the Müdafaa-i Milliye Cemiyeti Kadıköy (Merkezi) Hanımlar şubesi (Women's Branch of the (Central) Kadıköy National Defense Organization).

Life in exile
At the exile of the imperial family in March 1924, she and her daughter settled in France, taking up residence in the Mediterranean city of Nice. In 1931, her daughter married Moazzam Jah, younger son of Mir Osman Ali Khan, Nizam of Hyderabad, after which she traveled to India with her to help her settle in. Niloufer divorced Moazzam in 1952, returned to France and shared a flat with Adile in Paris.

Death
Adile died on 6 December 1973 in Paris, France, and was buried in Bobigny cemetery.

Honours
Order of Medjidie, Jeweled
 Order of Charity, 1st Class
 Navy Medal in Gold

Issue

In literature
 Adile Sultan is a character in Ayşe Osmanoğlu's historical novel The Gilded Cage on the Bosphorus (2020).

Ancestry

References

Sources

1887 births
Royalty from Istanbul
19th-century Ottoman princesses
20th-century Ottoman princesses
Exiles from the Ottoman Empire
1973 deaths